Benevolence or Benevolent may refer to:
 Benevolent (band)
 Benevolence (phrenology), a faculty in the discredited theory of phrenology
 "Benevolent" (song), a song by Tory Lanez
 Benevolence (tax), a forced loan imposed by English kings from the 14th to 17th centuries
 USS Benevolence (AH-13), a Haven-class hospital ship
 Benevolence, Georgia, a community in the United States

See also

 Altruism
 Good and evil
 Mettā, benevolence in Buddhism
 Omnibenevolence
 Ren (Confucianism)